Rinke Khanna (born Rinkle Jatin Khanna; 27 July 1977) is an Indian former actress. She is the youngest daughter of actress Dimple Kapadia and actor Rajesh Khanna, sister of Twinkle Khanna. She made her film debut with Pyaar Mein Kabhi Kabhi (1999), changing her original screen name from Rinkle to Rinke. In Mujhe Kucch Kehna Hai, she played a supporting role. She made her Tamil debut in the 2001 film Majunu. Notably, this was the only Tamil film she ever acted in. She starred in the 2004 film Chameli.

Personal life
Khanna was born on 27 July 1977 in Bombay (now Mumbai) to Rajesh Khanna and Dimple Kapadia. She is the youngest daughter of her parents. Her elder sister, Twinkle Khanna, is an actor. She married Samir Saran on 8 February 2003 and lives in London with her daughter, son and husband.

Filmography

Accolades
2000: Zee Cine Award for Best Female Debut - Pyaar Mein Kabhi Kabhi (Won)
2000: Filmfare Award for Best Female Debut - Pyaar Mein Kabhi Kabhi (Nominated)

References

External links

 
 

1977 births
Living people
Indian film actresses
Actresses from Mumbai
Actresses in Hindi cinema
Gujarati people
Punjabi people
21st-century Indian actresses
Zee Cine Awards winners